Susan M. Elliott is the President and CEO of The National Committee on American Foreign Policy (NCAFP) since August 2018 and a retired Foreign Service Officer who was the U.S. Ambassador to Tajikistan from 2012 to 2015.

Career
Elliott served as the Civilian Deputy and Foreign Policy Advisor to the Commander of the United States European Command (2015-2017). Before she was Ambassador, Elliot was the Deputy Assistant Secretary of State, Bureau of South and Central Asian Affairs.

Before joining the Foreign Service, Elliot received a doctoral degree from Indiana University and served on the faculties of Ball State University and the University of Virginia.

While Ambassador, Elliot's primary concerns were counterterrorism, border security, and working on “counter-narcotics.”

References

American women ambassadors
American women chief executives
Ambassadors of the United States to Tajikistan
Indiana University alumni
Ball State University faculty
University of Virginia faculty
American women academics
21st-century American diplomats
21st-century American women